Lady Douglas Island is an island in the North Coast region of the Canadian province of British Columbia. It is located off the south coast of Dowager Island.

Lady Douglas Island is part of a volcanic area called the Milbanke Sound Group which includes monogenetic cinder cones. Basaltic tuff breccias on Lady Douglas Island originated from Helmet Peak on the north end of Lake Island.

References

Islands of British Columbia
North Coast of British Columbia
Range 3 Coast Land District